Ernst Oberhammer was an Italian luger who competed during the 1980s. A natural track luger, he won three medals in the men's doubles event at the FIL World Luge Natural Track Championships with two golds (1982, 1984) and one silver (1986).

Oberhammer also won two medals in the men's doubles event at the FIL European Luge Natural Track Championships with a gold in 1987 and a bronze in 1985.

References
Natural track European Championships results 1970-2006.
Natural track World Championships results: 1979-2007

Italian lugers
Italian male lugers
Living people
Year of birth missing (living people)
Sportspeople from Südtirol